The Faroe Islands are administratively divided in 29 municipalities (kommunur), with about 120 cities and villages. Until December 31, 2008, there were 34 municipalities, and until December 31, 2004, there were 48 municipalities. In the coming years the number of Faroese municipalities is expected to drop to somewhere between 7 and 15, as there is currently a rationale towards municipal amalgamation and a decentralization of public services. In 1998 it was suggested that no municipality should have fewer than 2,000 inhabitants, but whether this will be true is a political question. The Faroese government has furthermore decided not to conduct forced, top-down amalgamation, but to leave the process to the free will of the municipalities. In many small municipalities there is some resistance to the amalgamation process, and as a result two kinds of municipalities are being created: large municipalities (town-municipalities) that are eager to attract smaller municipalities into amalgamation, and small municipalities which are either trying to avoid amalgamation or seek to amalgamate with other small municipalities. The geographically large Sunda municipality is an example of this. The larger municipalities are organized in Kommunusamskipan Føroya (KFS) and the smaller are organized in Føroya Kommunufelag (FKF).

List of municipalities

As of June 1, 2019, there were 29 municipalities in the Faroe Islands.

History

 On 1 January 2017 (30 municipalities reduced to 29):
 Húsar fused with Klaksvík
 On 1 January 2009 (34 municipalities reduced to 30):
 Funningur fused with Runavík.
 Gøta and Leirvík fused into Eystur.
 Miðvágur and Sandavágur fused into Vágar.
 Svínoy fused with Klaksvík.
 On 1 January 2005 (38 municipalities reduced to 34):
 Elduvík, Oyndarfjørður and Skála fused with Runavík.
 Gjógv, Haldarsvík, Hósvík, Hvalvík and Saksun fused with Sunda municipality.
 Hestur, Kirkjubøur and Nólsoy fused with Tórshavn.
 Mikladalur fused with Klaksvík.
 Mykines fused with Sørvágur.
 On 1 January 1997
 Argir and Kaldbak fused with Tórshavn.
 On 1 August 1948
 Funningur split into Funningur and Gjógv.

See also
 List of towns in the Faroe Islands
 Regions of the Faroe Islands
 List of islands of the Faroe Islands
 Subdivisions of Norden
 Politics of the Faroe Islands

Notes
Hagstova Føroya  - information from 2007.
Tórshavn is both the capital of the Streymoy region and its own region, the latter being identical with Tórshavn municipality, but not including the area of the former Kollafjarðar kommuna.
Klaksvík both capital of the Norðoyggjar region as well of its own region, which constitute of the two municipalities Klaksvík and Hvannasund.

References

Hagstova Føroya -  Municipalities by size and width, population growth and density, age and sex - December 31, 2002 (in PDF)
Hagstova Føroya -  Municipalities by size and width, population growth and density, age and sex - December 31, 2002 (in PDF)
Population by municipalities. 1 Jan. 2015 - PDF page 11

External links

 
Faroe Islands
Administrative divisions of the Faroe Islands
Faroe Islands 1
Faroe Islands geography-related lists
Faroe